Mummy: The Curse is a tabletop role-playing game in the Chronicles of Darkness series, created by C.A. Suleiman and published by Onyx Path Publishing on March 27, and released in a second edition on September 15, 2021.

Overview
Mummy: The Curse is a tabletop role-playing game using the Storytelling System. Players take the roles of mummies, the ancient servants of sorcerers who were the rulers of the mythical empire of Irem. The mummies have magically been given eternal life, and alternate between awake periods and long periods of hibernation throughout the millennia, gradually forgetting who they are; the gamemaster, who leads the game, determines significant events that have shaped the player characters' pasts, which is kept secret from the players.

When creating a character, players determine what guild they will belong to, along with other attributes, which influence the characters' worldviews and abilities. To use characters' powers, they need occult energy, which can be found in relics from the Irem Empire, which have been scattered around the world since Irem's fall.

Production
Mummy: The Curse was originally released in March 2013 by Onyx Path Publishing, both digitally and as a hardcover book, as the first new game in the Chronicles of Darkness series since Geist: The Sin-Eaters in 2009. Production of the game was financed through a crowdfunding campaign on the website Kickstarter, which had a goal of US$30,000, and in the end raised over $104,000. A second edition with updates to the rules, also by Onyx Path Publishing and financed through crowdfunding, was released on September 15, 2021. Whereas the first edition requires the World of Darkness core book to be played, the second edition has a stand-alone rulebook.

Books

References

External links 
 

Role-playing games introduced in 2013
Chronicles of Darkness
Kickstarter-funded tabletop games